Adornato is a surname. Notable people with the surname include:

 Ferdinando Adornato (born 1954), Italian politician and journalist
 Marc Adornato (born 1977), Canadian artist

Surnames of Italian origin